Ktiv hasar niqqud (literally "spelling lacking niqqud"), colloquially known as ktiv maleh (literally "full spelling"), are the rules for writing Hebrew without vowel points (niqqud), often replacing them with matres lectionis ( and ). In general use, niqqud are seldom used, except in specialized texts such as dictionaries, poetry, or texts for children or for new immigrants.

Comparison example
From a Hebrew translation of "The Raven" by Edgar Allan Poe (translated by Eliyahu Tsifer)

Historical examination

Ktiv haser
Ktiv haser is writing whose consonants match those generally used in voweled text, but without the actual niqqud. In vowelled text, the niqqud indicate the correct vowels, but when the niqqud is missing, the text is difficult to read, and the reader must make use of the context of each word to know the correct reading.

A typical example of a Hebrew text written in ktiv haser is the Torah, read in synagogues (simply called the Torah reading). For assistance readers often use a Tikkun, a book in which the text of the Torah appears in two side-by-side versions, one identical to the text which appears in the Torah, and one with niqqud and cantillation.

Ktiv male
Because of the difficulty of reading unvowelled text, the Va'ad ha-lashon introduced the Rules for the Spelling-Without-Niqqud, which in reality dictates ktiv male. Later on, these rules were adopted by the Academy of the Hebrew Language, which continued to revise them, and they were mostly accepted by the public, mainly for official writing.

Ktiv haser became obsolete in Modern Hebrew, and ktiv male has already been dominant for decades in unvowelled texts: all of the newspapers and books published in Hebrew are written in ktiv male. Additionally, it is common for children's books or texts for those with special needs to contain niqqud, but ktiv haser without niqqud is rare.

Despite the Academy's standardization of the rules for ktiv male, there is a substantial lack of unity in writing, partly because of a lack of grammatical knowledge, partly because of the historical layers of the language, and partly because of a number of linguistic categories in which the Academy's decisions are not popular. As a result, book publishers and newspaper editors make their own judgments.

Rules for spelling without niqqud
As is the norm for linguistic rules, the rules for spelling without niqqud are not entirely static. Changes occur from time to time, based on amassed experience. The last substantial change to the rules for spelling without niqqud was made in 1993 updated in 1996. The following is the summary of the current rules:

 Every letter that appears in vowelled text also appears in unvowelled text.
 After a letter vowelled with a kubuts (the vowel /u/), the letter  appears: ‎, ‎, .
 After a letter vowelled with a holam haser (the vowel /o/) the letter  appears: ‎, .
 After a letter vowelled with a hirik haser (the vowel /i/) the letter  appears: ‎, ‎, . The letter  does not appear in the following situations:
 Before a shva nah, for example: ‎, ‎, ;
 Words whose base forms do not contain the vowel /i/:  ‎()‎,  ‎()‎,  ‎();
 Before  (/ju/ or /jo/): ‎, ‎, ‎, .
 After a letter vowelled with a tsere (the vowel /e/) the letter  generally does not appear [ ‎(=‎),  ‎(=‎)], but there are situations when  does appear (‎) and in words in which tsere replaces hirik because the presence of a guttural letter (‎):  ‎(‎),  ‎().
 Consonantal  (the consonant /v/) is doubled in the middle of a word: ‎, . The letter is not doubled at the beginning or the end of a word: ‎, ‎, . Initial  is doubled when an affix letter is added except for the affix  (meaning "and-"). Thus from the word  one has  but  (that is).
 Consonantal  (the consonant /j/) is doubled in the middle of a word, for example: ‎, . The letter is not doubled at the beginning of a word or after affix letters: ‎,  ‎(=‎), .
Still, consonantal  is not doubled in the middle of a word when it is before or after mater lectionis: ‎, ‎,  ‎(=‎), ‎, .

Those are the most basic rules. Each one has exceptions which is described in the handbook "" (spelling rules without niqqud) that the Academy publishes in Hebrew.

Notes
 When a reader is likely to err in the reading of a word, the use of partial vowelling is recommended:  (to distinguish it from ).
 While the rules above apply to the writing of native Hebrew words, they are not used for spelling given names, which are frequently  written in ktiv haser rather than ktiv male: ‎, ‎, ‎.

See also
Hebrew alphabet

References

External links
Academy of the Hebrew Language rules
The Ivrix Project – Spell Checker

Hebrew grammar

ar:تسطير عبري#كتيب ملئ